Michael Howell (born 4 August 1982) is a former professional rugby league footballer who played for the St. George Illawarra Dragons from 2002 to 2004  and Toulouse Olympique in 2006.

References

Australian rugby league players
St. George Illawarra Dragons players
Toulouse Olympique players
Living people
1982 births
Rugby league locks
Rugby league second-rows
Rugby league players from Sydney